is a railway station in Adachi, Tokyo, Japan. Kita-Senju is the third-busiest station on the Tokyo Metro network, after Ikebukuro and Otemachi. It is the tenth-busiest JR East station.

Lines
Kita-Senju Station is served by the following lines.
JR East Joban Line
Tobu Skytree Line
Tokyo Metro Chiyoda Line
Tokyo Metro Hibiya Line
Tsukuba Express

Station layout

JR East
JR East platforms are on ground level.

Tokyo Metro Chiyoda Line
The Chiyoda Line platforms are underground.

Tobu Skytree Line and Tokyo Metro Hibiya Line
Platforms 1 to 4 are located on ground level (the first floor), and platforms 5 to 7 are elevated (the third floor).

Metropolitan Intercity Railway Company
The Tsukuba Express platforms are elevated.

History

The station opened on 25 December 1896.

From 17 March 2012, station numbering was introduced on all Tobu lines, with Kita-Senju Station becoming "TS-09".

The station facilities of the Hibiya and Chiyoda Lines were inherited by Tokyo Metro after the privatization of the Teito Rapid Transit Authority (TRTA) in 2004.

Passenger statistics
In fiscal 2013, the JR East station was used by an average of 203,428 passengers daily (boarding passengers only), making it the tenth-busiest station operated by JR East. In fiscal 2013, the Tokyo Metro Chiyoda station was used by an average of 283,962 passengers per day and the Tokyo Metro Hibiya station was used by an average of 291,466 passengers per day. Note that the latter statistics consider passengers who travel through Kita-Senju station on a through service as users of the station, even if they did not disembark at the station. The Chiyoda Line station is the third-busiest on the Tokyo Metro network which does not offer through services onto other lines. The JR East passenger figures for previous years are as shown below.

See also
 List of railway stations in Japan

References

External links

 JR East Kita-Senju Station 
 Tobu Railway Kita-Senju Station 
 Tokyo Metro Kita-Senju Station 
 TX Kita-Senju Station 

Railway stations in Japan opened in 1896
Railway stations in Tokyo
Jōban Line
Stations of East Japan Railway Company
Tokyo Metro Hibiya Line
Tokyo Metro Chiyoda Line
Stations of Tokyo Metro
Tobu Skytree Line
Stations of Tobu Railway
Stations of Tsukuba Express
Railway stations in Japan opened in 1898